The Scarf is a 1951 American film noir directed by Ewald André Dupont and starring John Ireland, Mercedes McCambridge, James Barton, and Emlyn Williams. The screenplay concerns a man who escapes from an insane asylum and tries to convince a crusty hermit, a drifting saloon singer, and himself that he is not a murderer.

Plot
John Ireland stars as John Barrington, an escapee from an institution for the criminally insane. Actually, Barrington is not insane, but the victim of a plot orchestrated by a clever murderer. The only person who believes Barrington's story is Ezra Thompson (James Barton) a turkey farmer who hides him from the authorities. Then a singing waitress named Cash-and-Carry Connie (Mercedes McCambridge) unwittingly provides the clue that will prove Barrington's innocence. Emlyn Williams co-stars as a psychiatrist.

Cast

 John Ireland as John Howard Barrington
 Mercedes McCambridge as Connie Carter
 James Barton as Ezra Thompson
 Emlyn Williams as Dr. David Dunbar
 Lloyd Gough as Asylum Dr. Gordon
 Basil Ruysdael as Cyrus Barrington
 David Bauer as Level Louie (as David Wolfe)
 Harry Shannon as Asylum Warden Anderson
 Celia Lovsky as Mrs. Cyrus Barrington
 David McMahon as State Trooper
 Chubby Johnson as Feed Store Manager
 Frank Jenks as Tom - Drunk cowboy
 Emmett Lynn as Jack the Waiter
 Dick Wessel as Sid - Drunk cowboy
 Frank Jaquet as Town Sheriff
 Iris Adrian as the floozy at Level Louie's Place

Reception

Critical response
Film critic Bosley Crowther panned the film, "For a picture so heavily loaded with lengthy and tedious talk, talk, talk, The Scarf, the new tenant at the Park Avenue, has depressingly little to say. As a matter of fact, it expresses, in several thousand words of dialogue—and in a running-time that amounts to just four minutes short of an hour and a half—perhaps the least measure of intelligence or dramatic continuity that you are likely to find in any picture, current or recent, that takes itself seriously."

References

External links

 
 
 
 
 

1951 films
1950s psychological thriller films
American black-and-white films
American thriller films
1950s English-language films
Film noir
Films directed by E. A. Dupont
Films scored by Herschel Burke Gilbert
United Artists films
1950s thriller films
1950s American films